Sydney Agnew (1931 – 18 January 1972) was a bus conductor and murder victim in Belfast, Northern Ireland.

Background

Agnew was a forty-year-old bus conductor, a father of three children, and a Protestant native of Belfast. In January 1972 he was one of a number of witnesses to a hijacking and burning of a bus at gunpoint by members of the IRA. A number of those responsible were arrested and to be tried, Agnew being one of those summoned to give testimony.

On the 18 January 1972, the door of his house off the Albertbridge Road was knocked by two teenagers. Agnew's six-year-old son opened the door, the teenagers brandished guns and opened fire on Agnew, shooting him several times.

Agnew was commemorated in the poem Wounds, written by the poet Michael Longley in May 1972, and published in his second book, An Exploded View, published in 1973.

External links
 http://cain.ulst.ac.uk/sutton/chron/1972.html
 http://www.belfasttelegraph.co.uk/opinion/columnists/gail-walker/old-prejudices-have-no-place-in-new-society-28691500.html
 HighBeam

1972 deaths
People from Belfast
People killed by the Provisional Irish Republican Army
People killed during The Troubles (Northern Ireland)
1972 in Northern Ireland
The Troubles in Belfast
Murder victims from Northern Ireland
Deaths by person in Northern Ireland
20th century in Belfast
1972 murders in the United Kingdom